Heart North and Mid Wales in Prestatyn, Wales
 Triple M Hobart  in Tasmania